Tito Sena (born 6 February 1967) is a Paralympian runner from Brazil who mainly competes in category T46 long-distance events. He won a silver medal in the marathon at the 2008 Paralympics and a gold at the 2012 Games.

External links

 

1967 births
Living people
Sportspeople from Brasília
Paralympic athletes of Brazil
Athletes (track and field) at the 2008 Summer Paralympics
Paralympic silver medalists for Brazil
Paralympic gold medalists for Brazil
Medalists at the 2008 Summer Paralympics
Medalists at the 2012 Summer Paralympics
Athletes (track and field) at the 2012 Summer Paralympics
Paralympic medalists in athletics (track and field)
Brazilian male long-distance runners
Brazilian male marathon runners
Medalists at the 2007 Parapan American Games
21st-century Brazilian people
20th-century Brazilian people